Serendipity is the third solo album by jazz pianist Mike Garson, and was released in 1986.

Track listing
All tracks composed by Michael Garson; except where indicated
"Serendipity"
"Lady" (Lionel Richie)
"Autumn Leaves" (Johnny Mercer, Joseph Kosma)
"I Should Care" (Axel Stordahl, Paul Weston, S. Kahn)
"Spirit of Play"
"Trio Blues"
"My Romance" (Lorenz Hart, Richard Rodgers)
"The Promise"
"Tam's Jam" (Billy Mintz, Gary Herbig, Jim Lacefield, Michael Garson, Peter Sprague)
"Searching"
"My One and Only Love" (Guy Wood, Robert Mellin)

Personnel
Mike Garson - piano
Peter Sprague – guitar
Jim Laceford, Stanley Clarke – bass
Gary Herbig – tenor and alto saxophone
Jim Walker – flute
Billy Mintz – drums

External links
 Serendipity at Amazon.com Album review and track listing
 mikegarson.com Official website with Discography

Mike Garson albums
1986 albums